Alnus firma is a species of Alnus from Japan.

References

External links
 
 

firma